The 12th Critics' Choice Awards were presented on January 14, 2007, honoring the finest achievements of 2006 filmmaking. The event was held at the Santa Monica Civic Auditorium in Santa Monica, California and broadcast on E!.

Top 10 films
(in alphabetical order)

 Babel
 Blood Diamond
 The Departed
 Dreamgirls
 Letters from Iwo Jima
 Little Children
 Little Miss Sunshine
 Notes on a Scandal
 The Queen
 United 93

Winners and nominees

Best Picture Made for Television
'''Elizabeth I
 The Librarian: Return to King Solomon's Mines
 Nightmares & Dreamscapes: From the Stories of Stephen King
 The Ron Clark Story
 When the Levees Broke: A Requiem in Four Acts

Statistics

References

Broadcast Film Critics Association Awards
2006 film awards